Kihoku is a place name in Japan:

Kihoku, Ehime, a town in Ehime Prefecture
Kihoku, Kagoshima, a former town in Kagoshima Prefecture
Kihoku, Mie, a town in Mie Prefecture